Hampel is a German surname. Notable people with the surname include:

Anton Joseph Hampel (1710–1771), German classical horn player
Armin-Paul Hampel (born 1957), German politician
Desiderius Hampel (1895–1981), Croatian SS general
Felicity Hampel (born 1955), Australian lawyer and judge
George Hampel (disambiguation), multiple people
Gunter Hampel (born 1937), German musician and composer
Jarosław Hampel (born 1982), Polish motorcycle speedway rider
József Hampel (1849–1913), Hungarian archaeologist
Olaf Hampel (born 1965), German bobsledder
Oliver Hampel (born 1985), German footballer
Otto and Elise Hampel (died 1943), German activists
Paul William Hampel, Russian spy

See also
Hampl
Hempel
Hample

German-language surnames